The Chairman of the Council of People's Deputies of Kemerovo is the presiding officer of that legislature.

Office-holders 

Lists of legislative speakers in Russia
Politics of Kemerovo Oblast